The Thirty-Second Wisconsin Legislature convened from  to  in regular session.

Senators representing odd-numbered districts were newly elected for this session and were serving the first year of a two-year term. Assembly members were elected to a one-year term. Assembly members and odd-numbered senators were elected in the general election of November 5, 1878. Senators representing even-numbered districts were serving the second year of their two-year term, having been elected in the general election held on November 6, 1877.

Major events
 January 22, 1879: Matthew H. Carpenter elected United States Senator by the Wisconsin Legislature in Joint Session.
 November 4, 1879: William E. Smith re-elected as Governor of Wisconsin.

Major legislation
 February 28, 1879: An Act to secure to children the benefits of an elementary education, 1879 Act 121.  Created a legal requirement for parents and legal guardians to send their children to school for at least one semester per year between the ages of 7 and 15.

Party summary

Senate summary

Assembly summary

Sessions
 1st Regular session: January 8, 1879March 5, 1879

Leaders

Senate leadership
 President of the Senate: James M. Bingham (R)
 President pro tempore: William T. Price (R)

Assembly leadership
 Speaker of the Assembly: David M. Kelly (R)

Members

Members of the Senate
Members of the Senate for the Thirty-Second Wisconsin Legislature:

Members of the Assembly
Members of the Assembly for the Thirty-Second Wisconsin Legislature:

Employees

Senate employees
 Chief Clerk: Charles E. Bross
 Assistant Clerk: W. S. Reynolds
 Bookkeeper: T. S. Ansley
 Engrossing Clerk: John P. Mitchell
 Enrolling Clerk: A. J. Smith
 Transcribing Clerk: Fred. Richards
 Proofreader: Thomas A. Dyson
 Clerk for the Judiciary Committee: H. M. Pierce
 Clerk for the Committee on Claims: L. F. Nickey
 Clerk for the Committee on Enrolled Bills: Walter L. Houser
 Sergeant-at-Arms: Chalmers Ingersoll
 Assistant Sergeant-at-Arms: William A. Adamson
 Postmaster: O. N. Russell
 Assistant Postmaster: A. C. Martin
 Gallery Attendant: O. A. Kluetz
 Doc. Room Attendant: William Graham
 Doorkeepers: 
 E. T. Songstad
 M. Simon
 A. Knudson
 John Halls
 Porter: John Redman
 Night Watch: Eugene A. Steer
 Chief Clerk's Messenger: J. G. Hyland
 President's Messenger: John Barrows
 Messengers: 
 Jos. Campbell
 Jas. H. Welch
 Harry M. Hathaway
 Thos. Farness
 Geo. Roe
 Jos. J. Gunkel
 Lono Loper
 Janitor: Ole Stevenson

Assembly employees
 Chief Clerk: John E. Eldred
 1st Assistant Clerk: William M. Fogo
 2nd Assistant Clerk: S. L. Perrine
 Bookkeeper: O. A. Southmayd
 Engrossing Clerk: T. J. Vaughn
 Enrolling Clerk: Franklin S. Lawrence
 Transcribing Clerk: F. W. Rogers
 Proof Reader: H. O. Fifield
 Sergeant-at-Arms: Miletus Knight
 Assistant Sergeant-at-Arms: William Seamonson
 Postmaster: J. J. Gibbs
 Assistant Postmaster: William Stanton
 Doorkeepers: 
 J. J. Burnard
 C. E. Webster
 George B. McMillen
 Fred Oelhafer
 Gallery Attendants:
 R. Worts
 J. L. Johnson
 Porter: C. Schneider
 Night Watch: N. V. Chandler
 Wash Room Attendant: J. W. Kildow
 Speaker's Messenger: E. H. Potter
 Clerk's Messenger: Arthur Truax
 Messengers:
 William Post
 John F. Sanderson
 Richard Kempter
 S. G. Bottum
 Harvey Barlow
 Candy Nicodemus
 William Renkema
 Eddie Kavenaugh
 Julius Leison
 B. F. Oakley
 Bertie Carter
 Freddie Wittl
 Jake Gill

Notes

References

External links
 1879: Related Documents from Wisconsin Legislature

1879 in Wisconsin
Wisconsin
Wisconsin legislative sessions